There were numerous deaths at the Berlin Wall, which stood as a barrier between West Berlin and East Berlin from 13 August 1961 until 9 November 1989.  Before the construction of the Berlin Wall in 1961, 3.5 million East Germans circumvented Eastern Bloc emigration restrictions, many by crossing over the border from East Berlin into West Berlin. From there they could then travel to West Germany and other Western European countries. Between 1961 and 1989, the Wall prevented almost all such emigration.

The state-funded Centre for Contemporary History (ZZF) in Potsdam has confirmed that "... at least 140 people were killed at the Berlin Wall or died under circumstances directly connected with the GDR border regime", including people attempting to escape, border guards, and innocent parties. However, researchers at the Checkpoint Charlie Museum have estimated the death toll to be significantly higher.

Escape attempts claimed the lives of many, from a child as young as one to an 80-year-old woman, and many died because of the accidental or illegal actions of the guards. In numerous legal cases throughout the 1990s, several border guards, along with political officials responsible for the defence policies, were found guilty of manslaughter and served probation or were jailed for their role in the Berlin Wall deaths.

Historical background

After World War II, Berlin had been divided into four sectors controlled by the Allies: the US, the Soviet Union, the United Kingdom and France. The sector borders inside the city could in general be used freely for passage out of the German Democratic Republic, even after the border between the Federal Republic of Germany and the GDR had been continually closed off, starting in 1952. The outer border of West Berlin, which was also the border between West-Berlin and the GDR, had also been closed down in 1952. During the night of 12 to 13 August 1961 the National People's Army, the German Border Police, the Volkspolizei and the Combat Groups of the Working Class locked down all passages between the Soviet sector and the three West sectors; construction of border protection facilities began.

During the first years border fortifications inside the city mostly consisted of brick walls with a top made of barbed wire. Clay bricks and concrete slabs were used for construction. Further obstacles of barbed wire and upstate walls delimitated the East and at some places, like Bernauer Straße, bricked-up buildings formed the boundary line. The buildings were situated on East-Berlin territory, whereas the pavement in front of the houses belonged to West-Berlin. In many places safety installations of West-Berlin's outer ring consisted of metal fences and barbed wire barriers. Technologically advanced upgrading took place later on and only in 1975 L-shaped concrete segments that were known from the fall of the Wall were added.

Identifying the death toll

Identifying deaths specifically attributable to the Berlin Wall is not straightforward. Although East Germans were aware of deaths on the Wall from West German media broadcasts which they were able to receive, reliable information was closely held by the East German authorities. A number of different West German institutions kept their own records. These included the West Berlin police, the Central Registry of State Judicial Administration in Salzgitter (which tracked all border fatalities) and the Arbeitsgruppe 13 August (Working Group 13 August), a West Berlin association. Within the jurisdiction of the West-Berlin police, the State Security Department was responsible for the registration of known incidents. The records distinguish between individuals who died at the outer border of West-Berlin (80 incidents), unclear incidents (with 5 possible wall victims) and border guards who were shot. The Central Registry of State Judicial Administrations in Salzgitter, was also given a mandate to collect evidence of actual or attempted murder in the GDR. In 1991, it published the "Salzgitter-Report" with the names of 78 victims. However, since the Registration Agency had no access to the GDR archives, the data was regarded as incomplete. Both agencies mainly listed incidents that could have been observed from West-Berlin or had been reported by fugitives or border patrols who left the GDR.

After the fall of the Wall, criminal investigations into border killings were launched by the Investigating Agency for Governmental and Party Crimes (ZERV) and the Berlin public prosecutor's office. Each of these institutions used different criteria to count deaths. In 2000, the ZERV compared data from the central registration office in Salzgitter with findings in GDR archives and made a total of 122 cases of targeted killing by GDR state organs at the border to West-Berlin. This list was a pre-inquiry for the prosecution departments of Berlin and Neuruppin, which in turn gave attention to legal processing. The Salzgitter registry recorded incidents in which "suspicion of a criminal act was justified", while the Arbeitsgruppe 13 August, which also manages the house at Checkpoint Charlie and is run by the artist Alexandra Hildebrandt, widow of the founder Rainer Hildebrandt, counted "all victims who died in connection with flight and/or the border regime", including deaths by accidents or drowning, or deaths of border soldiers and policemen in suicides or firearms accidents.  This gave them the figure of 235 deaths compared to the significantly lower number of 78 according to the Salzgitter registry.

The results, which are described as "temporary" by the working group, are regularly presented at press conferences on 13 August. The list is consistently revised with new cases being included and old ones abandoned. The Checkpoint Charlie Museum gives the number at 245 deaths, though this includes suicides by border guards and bodies found in the water even when there was no obvious link to them being an escapee. They also state that the first person to die at the Wall was in fact an East German officer who committed suicide.

In 2005, the Gedenkstätte Berliner Mauer (Centre for Contemporary History and the Berlin Wall Memorial Site and Documentation Centre) established a research project to definitively "establish the number and identities of the individuals who died at the Berlin Wall between 1961 and 1989 and to document their lives and deaths through historical and biographical research". The project was funded by the Federal Agency for Civic Education, Deutschlandradio and the Federal Commissioner of Culture and Media. The results were published on the website www.chronik-der-mauer.de and in a book titled "Todesopfer an der Berliner Mauer" (2009). The project outlines the victims' biographies, the causes of death and the sources that were used. At the time, no reliable or official information was available about the number of fatalities at the Wall. The project found that 136 people had died, using the criteria of "either an attempted escape or a temporal and spatial link between the death and the border regime". Not all had died immediately – one fatality occurred years later – and not all were caused by acts of violence. After reviewing 575 deaths, the project team found that at least 140 people died in shootings, were killed in accidents or committed suicide after failing to cross the Wall.

Criteria
Every investigation committee had its own criteria of which cases could be counted as wall victims. The ZERV investigations focused on a working legal guilt, while the ZZF and the Arbeitsgemeinschaft 13. August developed their own criteria that went beyond purely legal guilt. The ZZF criteria required the victim to have a background for the attempted escape or to have both a temporal and a spatial connection to the border regime. Five groups were developed from the examined cases:

 Fugitives shot and killed or fatally injured by East German security forces while trying to cross the Wall;
 Fugitives who died while attempting to cross the Wall, or who committed suicide when their attempt failed, or who suffered fatal injuries in the course of their attempt;
 People from East and West who were shot and killed or fatally injured by East German security forces;
 People from East and West who died or were fatally injured as a result of the actions or inaction of the East German security forces;
 Members of the East German border troops who were killed or suffered fatal injuries while on duty.

The definition coined by the Arbeitsgruppe 13. August reaches further. It includes border guards that committed suicide and cold cases involving bodies found in boundary waters.

However, a thorough investigation of all natural cases of death has not been completed yet. One third of all files from the police of transport are gone, entire annual reports of the 1970s are missing. Analyzing the daily records of border guards and to examine activities in areas that had been under surveillance might have presented an alternative but could not be realized because of financial issues. Another 16 cases of drowning could not definitively be connected to the Wall. Many other travellers from East and West Germany and Czechoslovakia died immediately before, during or after passing through checkpoints in Berlin, with a published figure of 251 deaths:  most were the result of cardiac arrest.

Controversy about the number of casualties
The exact number of casualties is unknown. There are different numbers that each derive from different investigations that used different definitions of what a victim in this case should be. Therefore, the numbers are hardly comparable. On top of that, some results are published infrequently or investigations were ceased with a provisional number. There is also a publicly held controversy between two groups regarding the number of victims. The opponents are the Arbeitsgemeinschaft 13. August and the ZZF. The former's numbers are higher, as they include, according to ZZF's Hans-Hermann Hertle, victims with an unclear or unsure connection to the border regime. After the ZZF published its interim results in August 2006, Alexandra Hildebrandt of the Arbeitsgemeinschaft has accused them of withholding numbers to invoke a more positive picture of East Germany. She argues that the ZZF project was funded by a coalition of social democrats and leftists.
In 2008 the Arbeitsgemeinschaft claimed that since 1961 222 people had died because of the Berlin Wall. Hertle doubted these numbers, as they evidently included some survivors. As of 2006, 36 survivors were listed as deceased because of the Wall, and some victims were mentioned more than once. Because of these shortcomings, he assessed the list as an "extensive record of suspected cases" that "failed to set up a scientifically verifiable standard". Berlin's Governing Mayor Klaus Wowereit commented on the dispute with the words "Every single dead was one too many." In 2009, Hildebrandt reported of 245 dead caused by the Wall. According to her research, the first Wall victim was a suicidal GDR officer and not Ida Siekmann, as Hildebrandt also included border guards that committed suicide and cold cases of bodies found in boundary waters in her list. Another difference in Hertle's and Hildebrandt's list can be explained by the fact that Hertle had additional access to incomplete files from transport police. Therefore, their accounts vary in regard to the people that died of natural causes during border controls. Hurtle argues with a total of 251 of such cases, while Hildebrandt only compiled 38 of these cases.

Information on the dead can be found mainly in the administrative and military archives of West and East Germany. However, the records of Stasi, which were administered by the Stasi federal commissioner, are not completely accessible. Some parts, especially from the later years, were destroyed when the ministry was disbanded, some are not yet sifted. Additionally, due to the Stasi records law, many records can only be looked at in the form of anonymized excerpts. An amendment from 2007 allows direct access to research projects, provided certain conditions are met. The East German Border Troop records are kept at the Bundeswehr archive, as the border troops were part of the East German National People Army. According to Hertle, when border troop, Stasi and the records from Western authorities are evaluated, one has to take into account the "values, interests and constraints of the record-keeping authorities and, by extension, of the respective power relations." The families of the victims can be another source, but were often fed with false information and therefore can only seldom answer questions regarding the events themselves.

First and last deaths
When Berlin was a divided city, the Berlin Wall ran along Bernauer Straße.  The street itself belonged to the French sector of West Berlin and the East German authorities declared that the windows and doors that led out onto Bernauer Straße should be bricked up.  In the early morning of 22 August 1961, Ida Siekmann was the first of 98 people to die while attempting to escape.  She was living on the fourth floor of number 48 (third floor, 3te Stock, by German standards), threw bedding and some possessions down onto the street, and jumped out of the window of her apartment. She fell on the sidewalk and was severely injured, dying shortly afterwards on her way to the Lazarus Hospital.

In February 1989, Chris Gueffroy was the last person shot trying to escape East Germany; he was not, however, the last to die escaping.  On 8 March 1989, Winfried Freudenberg became the last person to die in an attempt to escape from East Germany to West Berlin.  Freudenberg fell from a hot-air balloon while trying to fly over the Berlin Wall.

Causes and periods of deaths

The Berlin Wall, like the much longer inner German border between East and West Germany, was designed with two purposes in mind: to obstruct would-be border-crossers and to enable border guards to detect and stop illegal border crossings. It was guarded by around 11,500 Grenztruppen, the Border Troops of the German Democratic Republic who were authorised to use any means necessary, including firearms, to prevent border breaches. The shooting orders, or Schießbefehl, issued to the border guards instructed that people attempting to cross the Wall were criminals, and that the use of deadly force was required to deal with them: "Do not hesitate to use your firearm, not even when the border is breached in the company of women and children, which is a tactic the traitors have often used". Some guards have since claimed that the motto at the time was "a dead refugee is better than an escaped one". At first, wounded or shot refugees were left out in the open until they were removed, so that people from West Berlin and the western press could see them as well. After the reactions to the public death of Peter Fechter, border guards were ordered to move any casualties out of West Berlin's field of view. Negative reporting was sought to be prevented. Because of this, border guards often pulled people down into the car-moat that was part of the whole border security system. In some cases, the removal of the body was done only after nightfall.

The principal cause of death was shooting. Of the 140 fatalities, 99 (70.7%) were shot dead, not only escapees but also individuals on either side who were not attempting to escape, and East German border guards killed on duty. 101 of the fatalities were attempted border-crossers, of which all but three were East Germans (the exceptions were Franciszek Piesik and Czesław Kukuczka, Polish citizens, and Vladimir Ivanovich Odinzov, a Soviet soldier). 68 of them were killed in shootings. Another 30 people died as a result of shootings or fatal accidents sustained while in the vicinity of the Wall but not trying to cross it. Eight East German border soldiers were killed on duty by escapees, escape helpers, fellow soldiers, or the West Berlin police. Three people committed suicide after escape attempts failed.

About half of those who lost their lives on the Wall were killed in the first five years after it was originally installed. Death rates fell from then on, and took a particularly dramatic downturn after 1976. Nearly 86% of the Wall's victims, 120 people, died between 1961 and 1975; between 1976 and 1989 only 19 died. Several factors account for this reduction. The Wall became even more impregnable owing to technical improvements carried out in the mid-1970s and more restrictions were put on the area adjoining the Wall, making it more difficult to reach in the first place. The signing of the Helsinki Accords in 1975 led to new opportunities to cross the border legally, resulting in a rise in emigration applications and a corresponding fall in escape attempts.

Locations, demographics and motivations of the victims

Around two-thirds of the victims were killed in inner Berlin, accounting for 93 of the 140. Berlin-Mitte and Treptow were the inner-city districts with the most fatalities; nearly half of the 64 escapees who died on the sector border lost their lives in those two districts. The remaining third died on the city's outskirts where the suburbs of West Berlin intersected with towns and villages in East Germany. Several victims, including most of the children, drowned in the Spree or the Havel.

Most of those who died (comprising 78% of the fugitive victims) were young men aged between 16 and 30. Married men accounted for 20% of the deaths while only 8 (6%) were women. Nine children younger than 16 years old died, whereas 94 victims were aged between 21 and 30. The overwhelming majority came from East Berlin and the surrounding area.

Their motives for escaping evolved over time. Those who fled in the years shortly after the Wall was built had experienced the formerly open border first-hand and often had relatives in the West or had traveled there. By contrast, later escapees had grown up with the closed border, desired greater freedom and were dissatisfied with conditions in East Germany. Their attempts to escape were often triggered by specific events such as a wish to avoid conscription, repression by the authorities or the refusal of a request to emigrate. Many escapees had previously clashed with the state authorities and had been imprisoned for political offenses, often related to earlier unsuccessful escape attempts.

East German responses to deaths
The use of lethal force on the Berlin Wall was an integral part of the East German state's policy towards its border system. Nonetheless, the East German government was well aware that border killings had undesirable consequences. The West German, US, British and French authorities protested killings when they occurred and the international reputation of East Germany was damaged as a result. It also undermined the East German government's support at home.

The Stasi, East Germany's secret police, adopted a policy of concealing killings as much as possible. In the case of the November 1986 shooting of Michael Bittner at the Wall, a Stasi report commented: "The political sensitivity of the state border to Berlin (West) made it necessary to conceal the incident. Rumours about the incident had to be prevented from circulating, with information passing to West Berlin or the FRG [West Germany]." The Stasi took charge of "corpse cases" and those injured while trying to cross the border, who were transported to hospitals run by the Stasi or the police where they would recuperate before being transferred to Stasi prisons. The Stasi also took sole responsibility for the disposal of the dead and their possessions. Bodies were not returned to relatives but were cremated, usually at the crematorium at Baumschulenweg. Occasionally the cost of the cremations was covered by the victims themselves using money taken from their pockets.

Stasi officers posing as policemen would inform the relatives, though not before trying to obtain "valuable pieces of information on the border violation". Deaths would be stated as being due to "a border provocation of his own causing", "a fatal accident of his own causing" or "drowning in a border waterway". Every border death was investigated in detail to identify how the attempt had been made, whether there were any vulnerabilities in the border system that needed to be remedied and whether anyone else had been involved. If necessary, the family, relatives, friends, colleagues and neighbours were put under surveillance. The reports produced following such cases were sent to the relevant member of the East German Politburo for consideration.

The one exception to the general rule of concealment and obfuscation was that of border guards who died on duty. Most were killed either deliberately or accidentally by escapees or escape helpers. The dead guards were hailed by East German government propaganda as heroes, but West German public opinion was divided about the morality of killing border guards. Some took the view that escapees were entitled to use force in the course of crossing the border, but (as in one case tried in a West Berlin court) others saw the guard's life as taking priority over an escapee's freedom.

In those cases they did not manage to conceal, however, the GDR's media was subject to stringent controls by the Stasi as well as the Socialist Unity Party of Germany, using Neues Deutschland, the GDR's second largest daily newspaper, as their zentralorgan. Through its own television station, the GDR government controlled the content shown in television broadcasting as well. The GDR border troops' actions were being portrayed as legitimate border defense and the people who were killed while trying to escape were defamed both in official statements as well as in reports of the state-controlled media. In 1962, East German journalist Karl-Eduard von Schnitzler commented on the death of Peter Fechter in the television program Der schwarze Kanal: "The life of every single one of our brave boys in uniform is worth more than the life of a lawbreaker to us. Staying away from the border, you can save yourself blood, tears and screams." SED newspaper Neues Deutschland claimed Fechter was driven into suicide by "front city bandits" as well as accusing him of being homosexual.  In similar fashion, Günter Litfin was falsely depicted as being a homosexual, a prostitute as well as a criminal. In 1966, the Berliner Zeitung depicted Eduard Wroblewski as antisocial and being wanted as a Foreign Legionnaire for serious crimes in the district of Halle. These cases were exemplary of representatives of the press constructing false allegations in order to defame killed escapees.

West German responses to deaths
In cases of death, the Abgeordnetenhaus of Berlin and Mayor issued statements of indignation concerning the deceased, the Wall and the situation in the GDR. In some cases, the Senate of Western Berlin asked the respective American, British or French authorities to lodge a protest at the Soviet site. Up until the late sixties, terms like Wall of Shame (German: "Schandmauer" or "Mauer der Schande") were used by politicians from Western Berlin to denominate the wall. Speaking to the press, representatives also used misrepresented incidents as examples and depicted GDR state organs as responsible. After Rudolf Müller had shot the border guard Reinhold Huhn and fled west through a self-made tunnel, Egon Bahr, speaker of the Senate at that time, announced he had only thrown him an "uppercut". The western press also adopted this misstatement and used the heading "trigger-happy Vopos (colloquial German term for "Volkspolizei", the East German People's Police) killed own post." In other cases, the press published stories using drastic language to accuse the Wall as well as the people in charge. After Günter Litfins' death, the "B.Z."-tabloid wrote: "Ulbricht's manhunters became murderers!" The Frankfurter Allgemeine commented on the "brutal cold-bloodedness" of the guards.

The cases that were known in West Berlin provoked demonstrations among the population. Members of the Senate inspected the crime scenes and spoke to the press as well as public audiences. Various groups, and also individuals, launched protest campaigns against the Wall and the shootings. The fact that Peter Fechter bled to death in plain view of the public without anybody being able to help him led to spontaneous mass demonstrations, which in turn resulted in riots in the following night. West Berlin policemen and US soldiers prevented a storming of the Berlin Wall. Buses bringing Soviet soldiers to the Tiergarten where they were to guard the Soviet War Memorial were pelted with stones by protesters. The incident also led to anti-American protests, which were condemned by Willy Brandt. In the ensuing time, loudspeaker cars were sporadically set up at the Berlin Wall, urging the GDR border guards not to shoot at refugees and warning them of possible consequences. As a result of the shootings, West German groups lodged complaints with the UN Commission on Human Rights. The non-partisan Kuratorium Unteilbares Deutschland (Committee for an Indivisible Germany) sold protest placards and lapel pins in all of West Germany against the border regime and its consequences. Initially, West Berlin's regulatory authorities gave fugitives covering fire if they were being fired at by GDR border guards. This resulted in at least one lethal incident on 23 May 1962, when the border guard Peter Göring was shot dead by a West Berlin policeman while firing 44 times at a fleeing boy.

In 1991 Berlin's public prosecution department rendered this incident assistance in emergency and self-defence in consequence of the police officer stating that he felt his life being threatened. In many cases West Berliner rescuers were not able to reach wounded persons because they were either on GDR territory or in East Berlin. They had no authorization to set foot into this territory, so that a trespassing would have been life-endangering for the rescue workers. The four children Çetin Mert, Cengaver Katrancı, Siegfried Kroboth and Giuseppe Savoca, who fell into the Spree at the Gröben riverside between the years 1972 and 1975, could not be rescued even though West Berlin rescue forces arrived quickly on site. In April 1983 the transit passenger Rudolf Burkert died of a heart attack during an interrogation at the border checkpoint Derwitz. During a subsequent autopsy in West Germany several external injuries were detected, so that an external forceful impact could not be ruled out as the cause of death. This lethal incident resulted not only in negative press reports but also led to an intervention by Helmut Kohl and Franz Josef Strauss. For the imminent public-sector loans they imposed on the GDR the condition to conduct humane border controls. Two further deaths of West Germans in transit traffic, shortly after Burkert's death, set off demonstrations against the GDR regime and a broad media discussion. In the period that followed inspections decreased in transit traffic.

Western Allies' responses to deaths
After cases of death became public, the Western Allies lodged a protest at the Soviet government. In many known cases, the Western Allies did not react to requests for help. In the case of Peter Fechter, local US soldiers stated that they were not allowed to cross the border and enter East Berlin, although this was permitted to Allied military personnel when uniforms are worn. Major General Albert Watson, Town Major at that time, thus contacted his superiors in the White House, without receiving clear orders. Watson said: "This is a case for which I don't have any imperatives." President Kennedy was concerned over this issue and dispatched Security Advisor McGeorge Bundy to the Town Major to call for preventative measures against such incidents. Bundy, who already resided in Berlin for a pre-scheduled visit in 1962, informed Willy Brandt about the President's intention to back him up on this issue. He however clarified to Brandt and Adenauer, that US support ends at the wall, as there will be no efforts to dislodge it. Ten days after Fechter's death, Konrad Adenauer contacted the French President Charles de Gaulle, to send a letter to Nikita Khrushchev through him. De Gaulle offered his cooperation. Under the involvement of Willy Brandt, the four City Commanders reached an agreement concerning military ambulances from the western allies, which were now allowed to pick up injured persons from the border zone, to bring them to hospitals in East Berlin.

Legal cases
Many of those involved in the killings at the Berlin Wall were investigated in a number of legal proceedings.  Trials investigated border guards and senior political officials for their responsibility for the killings, some of which were believed to be unlawful.

Members of the National Defence Council, the political group responsible for the policies regarding the Berlin Wall, and the Socialist Unity Party of Germany (SED) were brought to court in the 1990s.  In 1997 Egon Krenz, who had in 1989 become the last Communist leader of East Germany, was sentenced to six-and-a-half years in prison for the manslaughter of four Germans who were shot while attempting to cross the Berlin Wall.  Other men to be given jail sentences include the Defence Minister at the time, Heinz Kessler, his deputy Fritz Streletz, Günter Schabowski and Günther Kleiber.

In November 2009 an interview with Kessler showed that he believed the Wall should never have been removed:

I deplore the fact that East Germans were shot while trying to flee westward, but the Berlin Wall served a useful purpose. It contributed to a polarisation between the two blocs, but it also gave a certain stability to their relationship. While the Wall was standing, there was peace. Today there's hardly a place that isn't in flames. Were you ever in East Germany? It was a wonderful country!

Two other key members of the National Defence Council, chairman Erich Honecker and Stasi leader Erich Mielke, were also investigated.  However, during the trial both men were seriously ill and the court controversially decided to drop the cases. Honecker died in 1994 and Mielke, who had served some time in jail for the 1931 murder of two police captains, died in 2000.

Many guards were themselves investigated for their actions, with the final case closing on 12 February 2004.  In some of the cases there was insufficient evidence to identify which guard had fired the fatal shot and thus no prosecution could be made.  Others were sentenced to probation for their role in the shootings. Only the guard who shot Walter Kittel was charged for manslaughter and sentenced to 10 years in prison. Numerous guards were the same ones who had been awarded a Medal for Exemplary Border Service or other award for the killing.

Deaths

The Centre for Contemporary History and the Berlin Wall Memorial Site and Documentation Centre identified 136 people who died at the Berlin Wall.  They detailed the event surrounding each death, stating where possible the role of the person.  This is listed here as:
Escapee – a person who had clear signs of attempting to escape
No intention – a person who showed no obvious intent to cross the border
Guard – a border guard on duty
Suicide – a person who approached the guards with the intention of being killed

Note: Some deaths occurred days or even years after the event at the Berlin Wall, with the victims later dying in hospital.

Commemoration
There has been commemoration of the victims both before and after the German reunification. There are various memorial sites and memorial services. There are also streets and squares that have been named after the dead.

Memorial sites

In remembrance of the victims there have been erected numerous memorial sites, funded by private initiatives and public bodies on the orders of the Berlin boroughs, the Berlin House of Representatives or the federal government, which are placed over various places in Berlin. The oldest date back to the days when the Wall was still standing. They include monuments, crucifixes and memorial stones, and were visited by foreign politicians during state visits. Together with the border installations, there were also some memorial sites that were removed when the Wall fell. Sites for fallen border guards were especially affected by this. Until the tenth anniversary of the building of the Wall, for every victim the private Berliner Bürger-Verein ("Berlin Citizen Association") placed a white wooden cross at the scene of the event. They were aided in their effort by the senate of West-Berlin. On 13 August 1971, the memorial site Weiße Kreuze ("White Crosses") was inaugurated on the east side of the Reichstag building.

On a fence in front of the wall, there were memorial crosses with the names and date of death on them. However, since the government moved to Berlin, the white crosses had to be relocated in 1995 from the eastern side of the Reichstag. The new location is on the west side of the building at a fence of the Tiergarten. 2003, Wolfgang Thierse inaugurated a new memorial designed by Jan Wehberg with the same name as the one on Reichstagufer. On seven both-sided inscribed crosses are the names of the 13 deaths. Another memorial of the Civil Association was in Bernauer Straße. Other victims are remembered through commemorative plates embedded in sidewalks and other installations which are nearby their death spot. In October 2004, the Working Group 13 August built the Freedom Memorial at Checkpoint Charlie. It reminds people of the victims of the Berlin Wall and the inner German border with 1067 crosses. The memorial had to be removed after about half a year because the landowners terminated the lease with the working group.

With the help of other artists, performance artist Ben Wagin founded The Parliament of Trees in the former death strip on the east side of the Spree River, opposite the Reichstag. 258 names of victims of the Wall are listed on granite slabs. Some listed as "unknown man" or "unknown woman" are merely identified with a date of death. The collection, which was created in 1990, contains people who were later not considered to be victims of the Wall. Black and white painted segments of the Wall stand in the background. The memorial needed to be minimized for the construction of the Marie-Elisabeth-Lüders-Haus. In 2005, a further memorial was opened in the basement of the Bundestag building. They used wall segments of the former Parliament of Trees. In 1998, the Republic of Germany and the state of Berlin established the Berlin Wall Memorial on Bernauer Straße and declared it as a national memorial. The memorial harks back to a draft drawn up by the architects Kohlhoff & Kohlhoff. Later, it was extended and today it includes the Berlin Wall Documentation Center, a visiting center, the Chapel of Reconciliation, the Window of Remembrance with portraits of those who lost their lives on the grounds of the Berlin Wall, and a 60-meter-long section of the former border installations which is enclosed by steel walls at both ends.
The northern wall bears the inscription:"In memory of the city's division from 13. August 1961 to 9. November 1989 and in commemoration of the victims of the communist reign of violence". In remembrance of the Building of the Berlin Wall's 50th anniversary the foundation "Berliner Mauer" erected 29 steles, which commemorate the victims, along the former border between West Germany and the GDR. Apart from the 3,6 meters large, orange pillars, several signs inform about the wall victims. A planned stele for Lothar Hennig in Sacrow was not built for the time being, because Henning is viewed skeptically as a result of his actions for the MfS as a former IM.

Commemoration services
Several organizations – for a large part associations or private initiatives – have been carrying out annual commemoration services in Berlin ever since the first casualties occurred. These services are usually held on the anniversary of the building of the Berlin Wall; they were partially supported by West Berlin's district offices or by the senate minutes. As a result of this, the "Hour of Silence" was introduced for silent prayers on every 13 August between 20 and 21 o'clock. Ever since 13 August 1990, the Federal State of Berlin commemorates the deaths. This ceremony takes place every year at the "Peter-Fechter-Kreuz" in the Zimmerstraße near Checkpoint Charlie. Besides these, there are also many commemoration services and protests against the Berlin Wall at other locations in Germany and abroad on 13 August. An annual commemoration service of the fall of the Berlin Wall takes place on 9 November each year at Eureka College in Illinois, United States, the alma mater of President Ronald Reagan.

Footnotes
 Rudolf Urban and his wife both tried to climb out from a window at their home of Bernauer Straße 1 on 19 August 1961 while trying to escape but fell to the ground and were injured.  They both went to hospital with their injuries.
 Tried to break through the border crossing in a truck filled with sand and gravel; he was shot several times and suffocated in the sand that entered the cab after the truck crashed.
 Had surrendered when he was shot; the border guard responsible was found guilty of murder in 1992.
 National People's Army soldier who had deserted
e      In these five cases the guards were accused of obstructing the rescue of those who were drowning.
 After an evening of dancing on 7 July 1962 Mende was escorted to a guard house for not having sufficient identification.  Believing the matter over, he ran towards the bus home and was shot.  He died nearly six years later.
g  Married couple Eckhardt and Christel committed suicide after a failed plane hijacking.
Was hiding with his parents in the crates in the back of a truck crossing the border when he began to cry.  His mother held his mouth and he died of suffocation.
 Ruled as a suicide by a court in Berlin, Sprenger was shot as he approached a watchtower.  He had been diagnosed with lung cancer and had told his wife that he would return in a coffin.

See also
Republikflucht
History of Berlin
The Tunnel (NBC documentary)
Chapel of Reconciliation

References

Sources 

Berlin Wall deaths
 
Berlin Wall
Wall deaths
Berlin Wall deaths
Berlin Wall deaths
Berlin Wall